Kate White (born 1977) is a Canadian politician, who was elected to in the Yukon Legislative Assembly in the 2011 election. She represents the Whitehorse electoral district of Takhini-Kopper King as a member of the Yukon New Democratic Party caucus.

Since May 2019, she has been leader of the Yukon NDP.

Political career

White first entered territorial politics in the 2006 election, when she ran in the riding of Porter Creek Centre for the Yukon New Democratic Party against incumbent Yukon Party Cabinet minister Archie Lang. She finished third.

In 2011, she ran again for the NDP in the newly created riding of Takhini-Kopper King, defeating former Whitehorse City Councillor Samson Hartland to win the riding. She was part of the Official Opposition in the 33rd Legislative Assembly served on the Standing Committee on Appointments to Major Government Boards and Committees. She was re-elected in 2016 election, defeating popular Yukon Olympian and Liberal candidate Jeane Lassen. She was one of just two New Democrat caucus members to be re-elected in that election, which was the party's worst showing since 1978.

White is the Yukon New Democratic Party caucus critic for the Department of Community Services, the Department of Education, the Department of Health and Social Services, the Department of Environment, the Yukon Housing Corporation, the Women's Directorate, the French Language Services Directorate, the Yukon Development Corporation, the Yukon Energy Corporation, and the Yukon Lottery Commission. She is also the Third Party House Leader and sits on the Standing Committee on Statutory Instruments and the Standing Committee on Appointments to Major Government Boards and Committees.

White is widely regarded as a passionate advocate for the rights of mobile home owners within her riding, which contains three mobile home parks.

On February 1, 2019, White announced her intent to succeed Liz Hanson as Leader of the Yukon New Democratic Party.

In May 2019, White was acclaimed as the new party leader, replacing Hanson. In the 2021 election the Yukon NDP under White won three seats. On April 23, the incumbent Liberals were sworn in with a minority government. On April 29, the Yukon Liberals and NDP announced that they had struck a formal confidence and supply agreement to allow the Liberals to form a minority government.

Personal life

Before entering politics, White earned a culinary diploma and a Red Seal in baking. She has also worked in the mining industry and as a life skills coach with women within the Yukon's correctional system.

She is bilingual in English and French.

Electoral record

2016 general election

|-

| NDP
| Kate White
| align="right"| 605
| align="right"| 46.1%
| align="right"| +0.2%

| Liberal
| Jeane Lassen
| align="right"| 478
| align="right"| 36.4%
| align="right"| +14.0%

|-
! align=left colspan=3|Total
! align=right| 1312
! align=right| 100.0%
! align=right| –
|}

2011 general election

|-

| NDP
| Kate White
| align="right"| 458
| align="right"| 45.9%
| align="right"| –

| Liberal
| Cherish Clarke
| align="right"| 224
| align="right"| 22.4%
| align="right"| –

|-
! align=left colspan=3|Total
! align=right| 998
! align=right| 100.0%
! align=right| –
|}

2006 general election

|-

|Liberal
|David Laxton
|align="right"|224
|align="right"|30.8%
|align="right"|-9.5%
|-

|NDP
|Kate White
|align="right"|159
|align="right"|21.9%
|align="right"|+13.8%
|- bgcolor="white"
!align="left" colspan=3|Total
!align="right"|727
!align="right"|100.0%
!align="right"| –

References

Yukon New Democratic Party MLAs
Women MLAs in Yukon
Living people
Politicians from Whitehorse
21st-century Canadian politicians
21st-century Canadian women politicians
Female Canadian political party leaders
1977 births